The 1995 Meath Senior Football Championship is the 103rd edition of the Meath GAA's premier club Gaelic football tournament for senior graded teams in County Meath, Ireland. The tournament consists of 17 teams, with the winner going on to represent Meath in the Leinster Senior Club Football Championship. The championship starts with a group stage and then progresses to a knock out stage.

This was Kilmainhamwood's return to the grade after a 9-year exodus claiming the 1994 Meath Intermediate Football Championship title.

Seneschalstown were the defending champions after they defeated Skryne in the previous years final, however they bowed out at the semi-final stage to the eventual champions.

Dunderry claimed their 1st S.F.C. title when beating Kilmainhamwood 1–11 to 0–10 in the final at Pairc Tailteann on 1 October 1995. John Brady raised the Keegan Cup for Dunderry while Tommy Dowd claimed the 'Man of the Match' award.

Team Changes

The following teams have changed division since the 1994 championship season.

To S.F.C.
Promoted from I.F.C.
 Kilmainhamwood  -  (Intermediate Champions)

From S.F.C.
Regraded to I.F.C.
 None

Group stage

Group A

Round 1
 St. Peter's Dunboyne 2-13, 0-6 Gaeil Colmcille, 16/4/1995,
 St. Michael's 1-6, 1-4 Ballinlough, 16/4/1995,
 Seneschalstown 2-15, 1-8 Navan O'Mahonys, 16/4/1995,

Round 2
 Navan O'Mahonys 0-9, 0-7 St. Michael's, 30/4/1995,
 St. Peter's Dunboyne 0–11, 1-8 Ballinlough, 30/4/1995,
 Seneschalstown 3–5, 1-11 Gaeil Colmcille, 30/4/1995,

Round 3
 St. Peter's Dunboyne 1-11, 0-5 Navan O'Mahonys, 14/5/1995,
 Seneschalstown 3-13, 1-5 St. Michael's, 14/5/1995,
 Ballinlough 1-8, 2-4 Gaeil Colmcille, 14/5/1995,

Round 4
 St. Michael's 0–8, 1-5 Gaeil Colmcille, 18/6/1995,
 Seneschalstown 0-13, 1-5 St. Peter's Dunboyne, 18/6/1995,
 Navan O'Mahonys 1-14, 1-9 Ballinlough, 18/6/1995,

Round 5
 Seneschalstown 2-13, 3-4 Ballinlough, 9/7/1995,
 St. Peter's Dunboyne 0-11, 0-6 St. Michael's, 9/7/1995,
 Navan O'Mahonys 1-9, 0-9 Gaeil Colmcille, 9/7/1995,

Group B

Round 1
 Slane 0-10, 0-9 Summerhill, 16/4/1995,
 Trim 0-12, 1-5 St. Colmcille's, 16/4/1995,
 Walterstown 1-7, 0-8 Oldcastle, 16/4/1995,

Round 2
 Slane 1-8, 0-6 Oldcastle, 30/4/1995,
 Walterstown 0-12, 0-10 Trim, 7/5/1995,
 Summerhill 0-18, 0-6 St. Colmcille's, 7/5/1995,

Round 3
 Slane 0-8, 0-4 Trim, 14/5/1995,
 Summerhill 2-18, 0-8 Oldcastle, 14/5/1995,
 Walterstown 0-12, 0-5 St. Colmcille's, 4/6/1995,

Round 4
 Slane 1-11, 2-6 St. Colmcille's, 18/6/1995,
 Oldcastle 2-10, 1-8 Trim, 18/6/1995,
 Summerhill 1-8, 0-8 Walterstown, 18/6/1995,

Round 5
 Slane 0-10, 0-6 Walterstown, 2/7/1995,
 St. Colmcille's 0-14, 0-6 Oldcastle, 9/7/1995,
 Summerhill 0-17, 0-11 Trim, 9/7/1995,

Group C

Round 1:
 Skryne 0-13, 0-8 Moynalvey, 16/4/1995,
 Kilmainhamwood 1-15, 1-11 Dunderry, 16/4/1995,
 Carnaross - Bye,

Round 2:
 Skryne 0-14, 1-10 Carnaross, 7/5/1995,
 Kilmainhamwood 1-11, 1-4 Moynalvey, 7/5/1995,
 Dunderry - Bye,

Round 3:
 Kilmainhamwood 1-13, 1-12 Skryne, 18/6/1995,
 Dunderry 2-9, 2-8 Carnaross, 18/6/1995,
 Moynalvey - Bye,

Round 4:
 Moynalvey 3-7, 0-10 Carnaross, 9/7/1995,
 Dunderry 0-10, 1-5 Skryne, 9/7/1995,
 Kilmainhamwood - Bye,

Round 5:
 Kilmainhamwood w, l Carnaross, 27/8/1995,
 Dunderry 1–12, 2-9 Moynalvey, 27/8/1995,
 Skryne - Bye,

Knock-out Stages
The teams in the quarter-finals are the second placed teams from each group and the Group C winner. The teams in the semi finals are Group A and B winners along with the quarter final winners.

Quarter-Finals:
 Kilmainhamwood 2-8, 0-9 St. Peter's Dunboyne, 27/8/1995,
 Dunderry 2-12, 2-7 Summerhill, 3/9/1995,

Semi-Finals:
 Kilmainhamwood 1-8, 1-3 Slane, 10/9/1995,
 Dunderry 1-12, 2-7 Seneschalstown, 10/9/1995,

Final:
 Dunderry 1-11, 0-10 Kilmainhamwood, Pairc Tailteann, 1/10/1995,

Leinster Senior Club Football Championship
Quarter-Final:
 Dunderry 1-10, 0-8 Mullingar Shamrocks, Pairc Tailteann, 28/10/1995,

Semi-Final:
 An Tóchar 1-13, 1-12 Dunderry, St. Conleth's Park, 19/11/1995,

References

External links

Meath Senior Football Championship
Meath Senior Football Championship